Tangab-e Shur (also Romanized as Tangāb-e Shūr) is a village in Sepidar Rural District, in the Central District of Boyer-Ahmad County, Kohgiluyeh and Boyer-Ahmad Province, Iran. At the 2006 census, its population was 86, in 18 families.

References 

Populated places in Boyer-Ahmad County